Kut-e Seyyed Naeim Taleghani (also Romanized as Kūt-e Seyyed Nā‘īm Taleghani) is a city in Howmeh-ye Sharqi Rural District, in the Central District of Dasht-e Azadegan County, Khuzestan Province, Iran. At the 2006 census, its population was 4,734, in 897 families.

References 

Populated places in Dasht-e Azadegan County
Cities in Khuzestan Province